Taimur Ali (born 1 June 1991) is a Pakistani cricketer who played for Balochistan cricket team. In January 2021, he was named in Balochistan's squad for the 2020–21 Pakistan Cup.

References

External links
 

1991 births
Living people
Pakistani cricketers
Balochistan cricketers
Quetta cricketers
Cricketers from Balochistan, Pakistan
South Asian Games bronze medalists for Pakistan
South Asian Games medalists in cricket